The 2007 Presbyterian Blue Hose football team represented Presbyterian College in the 2007 NCAA Division I FCS football season as an independent. They were led by first-year head coach Bobby Bentley and played their home games at Bailey Memorial Stadium.

Schedule

References

Presbyterian
Presbyterian Blue Hose football seasons
Presbyterian Blue Hose football